The Langley Blaze are a youth baseball team located in the city of Langley, British Columbia.

The Langley Blaze was founded in 2001 by Doug Mathieson, a former right-handed pitcher who played in the MLB Minor Leagues for seven years. The Blaze's home field is located in the McLeod Athletic Park which was completed in 2003. Prior to the completion, the Blaze played at City Park. They are part of the B.C. Premier Baseball League.  They are always a strong contender in the league.

Doug Mathieson continues to be the GM for the Langley Blaze and is also the Canada/Alaska Area Scout for the Arizona Diamondbacks. In the 2016 MLB Draft, Doug had four Canadians drafted by the Diamondbacks which set a record for the most number of Canadian players drafted by one club in the MLB. Doug's own son, Scott is also a RHP who played in the MLB for the Philadelphia Phillies and currently plays for the Yomiuri Giants in the Japanese League.

Since 2001, thirty-four players from the Blaze have been drafted by the MLB (Major League Baseball).

Current roster

Notable alumni 
Tyler O'Neill (current outfielder for the St. Louis Cardinals)
Brett Lawrie (former 1st round pick of the Milwaukee Brewers)
Scott Mathieson (former pitcher for the Philadelphia Phillies)

References

External links
 Official Website
 Langley Blaze page on BCPBL website

Baseball teams in British Columbia
Amateur baseball teams in Canada
Baseball teams established in 1999
Langley, British Columbia (city)
1999 establishments in British Columbia